The thermal design power (TDP), sometimes called thermal design point, is the maximum amount of heat generated by a computer chip or component (often a CPU, GPU or system on a chip) that the cooling system in a computer is designed to dissipate under any workload.

Some sources state that the peak power rating for a microprocessor is usually 1.5 times the TDP rating.

Intel has introduced a new metric called scenario design power (SDP) for some Ivy Bridge Y-series processors.

Calculation 

The average CPU power (ACP) is the power consumption of central processing units, especially server processors, under "average" daily usage as defined by Advanced Micro Devices (AMD) for use in its line of processors based on the K10 microarchitecture (Opteron 8300 and 2300 series processors). Intel's thermal design power (TDP), used for Pentium and Core 2 processors, measures the energy consumption under high workload; it is numerically somewhat higher than the "average" ACP rating of the same processor.

According to AMD the ACP rating includes the power consumption when running several benchmarks, including TPC-C, SPECcpu2006, SPECjbb2005 and STREAM Benchmark (memory bandwidth),
 which AMD said is an appropriate method of power consumption measurement for data centers and server-intensive workload environments. AMD said that the ACP and TDP values of the processors will both be stated and do not replace one another. Barcelona and later server processors have the two power figures.

The TDP of a CPU has been underestimated in some cases, leading to certain real applications (typically strenuous, such as video encoding or games) causing the CPU to exceed its specified TDP and resulting in overloading the computer's cooling system.  In this case, CPUs either cause a system failure (a "therm-trip") or throttle their speed down.  Most modern processors will cause a therm-trip only upon a catastrophic cooling failure, such as a no longer operational fan or an incorrectly mounted heat sink.

For example, a laptop's CPU cooling system may be designed for a 20 W TDP, which means that it can dissipate up to 20 watts of heat without exceeding the maximum junction temperature for the laptop's CPU. A cooling system can do this using an active cooling method (e.g. conduction coupled with forced convection) such as a heat sink with a fan, or any of the two passive cooling methods: thermal radiation or conduction. Typically, a combination of these methods is used.

Since safety margins and the definition of what constitutes a real application vary among manufacturers, TDP values between different manufacturers cannot be accurately compared (a processor with a TDP of, for example, 100 W will almost certainly use more power at full load than processors with a fraction of said TDP, and very probably more than processors with lower TDP from the same manufacturer, but it may or may not use more power than a processor from a different manufacturer with a not excessively lower TDP, such as 90 W). Additionally, TDPs are often specified for families of processors, with the low-end models usually using significantly less power than those at the high end of the family.

Until around 2006 AMD used to report the maximum power draw of its processors as TDP. Intel changed this practice with the introduction of its Conroe family of processors. Intel calculates a specified chip's TDP according to the amount of power the computer's fan and heatsink need to be able to dissipate while the chip is under sustained load. Actual power usage can be higher or (much) lower than TDP, but the figure is intended to give guidance to engineers designing cooling solutions for their products. In particular, Intel's measurement also does not fully take into account Intel Turbo Boost due to the default time limits, while AMD does because AMD Turbo Core always tries to push for the maximum power.

Alternatives 

TDP specifications for some processors may allow them to work under multiple different power levels, depending on the usage scenario, available cooling capacities and desired power consumption.  Technologies that provide such variable TDPs include Intel's configurable TDP (cTDP) and scenario design power (SDP), and AMD's TDP power cap.

Configurable TDP (cTDP), also known as programmable TDP or TDP power cap, is an operating mode of later generations of Intel mobile processors and AMD processors that allows adjustments in their TDP values.  By modifying the processor behavior and its performance levels, power consumption of a processor can be changed altering its TDP at the same time.  That way, a processor can operate at higher or lower performance levels, depending on the available cooling capacities and desired power consumption.

Intel processors that support cTDP provide three operating modes:

 Nominal TDP this is the processor's rated frequency and TDP.
 cTDP down when a cooler or quieter mode of operation is desired, this mode specifies a lower TDP and lower guaranteed frequency versus the nominal mode.
 cTDP up when extra cooling is available, this mode specifies a higher TDP and higher guaranteed frequency versus the nominal mode.

For example, some of the mobile Haswell processors support cTDP up, cTDP down, or both modes.  As another example, some of the AMD Opteron processors and Kaveri APUs can be configured for lower TDP values.  IBM's POWER8 processor implements a similar power capping functionality through its embedded on-chip controller (OCC).

Intel's description of scenario design power (SDP): "SDP is an additional thermal reference point meant to represent thermally relevant device usage in real-world environmental scenarios. It balances performance and power requirements across system workloads to represent real-world power usage."

Scenario design power (SDP) is not an additional power state of a processor. The SDP only states the average power consumption of a processor using a certain mix of benchmark programs to simulate "real-world" scenarios". For example, Y-series (extreme-low power) mobile Haswell processor show the difference between TDP and SDP.

See also 

 Heat generation in integrated circuits
 List of CPU power dissipation figures
 Operating temperature
 Power rating
 Intel Turbo Boost
 AMD Turbo Core

References

External links 

 Details on AMD Bulldozer: Opterons to Feature Configurable TDP, AnandTech, July 15, 2011, by Johan De Gelas and Kristian Vättö
 Making x86 Run Cool, April 15, 2001, by Paul DeMone

Computer engineering
Heat transfer